Saint-Michel-sur-Orge (literally Saint-Michel on Orge) is a commune in the Essonne département of France. It is in the southern suburbs of Paris,  from the center of Paris.

Inhabitants of Saint-Michel-sur-Orge are known as Saint-Michellois.

Transport
Saint-Michel-sur-Orge is served by Saint-Michel-sur-Orge station on Paris RER line C. The 401 bus line connects Saint-Michel-sur-Orge to Évry, the capital of the department.

Population

Education
There are eight primary schools in the commune.

Secondary schools: 
 Collège Jean Moulin and Collège Nicolas Boileau (junior high schools)
 Lycée Léonard de Vinci (senior high)

See also
Communes of the Essonne department

References

External links

Official website 

Mayors of Essonne Association 

Communes of Essonne